Tempest Mountain is in the Beartooth Mountains in the U.S. state of Montana. The peak is one of the tallest in the Beartooth Mountains, the eighth tallest in Montana and is in the Absaroka-Beartooth Wilderness of Custer National Forest. Tempest Mountain is less than  ENE of Granite Peak, the tallest mountain in Montana.

References

Tempest
Beartooth Mountains
Mountains of Carbon County, Montana